The Saline Range is a mountain range in Inyo County, California, within Death Valley National Park.

Geography
The Saline Range is to the northwest of Death Valley and frames the eastern side of the Saline Valley. The Inyo Mountains form the western side. To the east is the Last Chance Range, and to the south the Nelson Range.

References

See also
Mountain ranges of the Mojave Desert
Protected areas of the Mojave Desert

Mountain ranges of the Mojave Desert
Mountain ranges of Inyo County, California
Death Valley National Park